Devaraya is a 2012 Indian Telugu-language fantasy-comedy film starring Srikanth, Meenakshi Dixit and Vidisha in the lead roles directed by Nani Krishna and Produced by Kiran Jakkam Shetty & Nani Krishna. Chakri composed the score and soundtrack. The film was released worldwide on 7 December 2012.

Plot

Cast
 Srikanth as Sri Krishna Devaraya / Dora Babu
 Meenakshi Dixit as Sunanda
 Vidisha as Swapna
 Jaya Prakash Reddy
 M. S. Narayana
 M. Balayya as Mahamamthri Thimmarusu
 Praveen
 Jeeva
 Sivaji Raja
 Ranganath
 Raghu Karumanchi as Dorababu

Production
The film was launched in Hyderabad on 31 August 2011. Srikanth will be seen in a double role of Sri Krishna Devaraya, a famous Indian emperor known for his contributions in terms of arts and literature and Dora Babu, a reckless, irresponsible, hedonistic person in a nondescript village. Meenakshi Dixit, who was last seen in an item song in Mahesh Babu's Dookudu is playing the female lead in the film. She appears as a princess alongside Srikanth in it and she felt lucky to essay this role. Kanishka Soni sizzled in the item song "Bavlu" in this movie.

Soundtrack

The audio release event of Devaraya was a grand event, which witnessed the presence of Meenakshi Deekshith, Vidisha, Kottaplly Subbaraidu, Prasanna Kumar, Sagar, Tammareddy Bharadwaja, Girish Reddy, Poorna, Sammetta Gandhi, Madhav, Ravi Kumar Chavali, Chakri, Sanvi, Puppala Ramesh, Sivaji Raja, KVV Satyanarayana and many others.

Prominent actor Pawan Kalyan attended the audio launch of Devaraya, which was held at a private auditorium in Hyderabad on 12 September 2012. Pawan Kalyan unveiled the audio CD's amidst huge fanfare and handed it over to AP State minister Ghanta Srinivasa Rao. Later, Pawan Kalyan addressed the music launch function of Devaraya and said that Srikanth is very close to his brother Chiranjeevi and he has very high regard for him. He had seen the trailers of the movie and very impressed with it. He wished the entire team good luck and hoped that the music of the film will be a chartbuster.

References

External links 

 

2012 films
Indian historical comedy films
Indian fantasy comedy films
Indian historical fantasy films
2010s Telugu-language films
Films scored by Chakri
2010s historical comedy films
2010s fantasy comedy films
2010s historical fantasy films
2012 comedy films